The Brazil under 20 rugby team is the junior national rugby union team from Brazil. They replace the two former age grade teams Under 19s and Under 21s. The team competed at the World Rugby Under 20 Trophy.

Current squad
Squad to 2019 World Rugby Under 20 Trophy.

References

Under20
National under-20 rugby union teams